The 2022 Canada Sevens was a rugby sevens tournament for men's national teams held on 16–17 April 2022 at BC Place, Vancouver, British Columbia, Canada as part of the 2021–22 World Rugby Sevens Series.

The event was won by Argentina, with player of the match Marcos Moneta scoring two tries in their 29–10 win against Fiji in the final.

Australia defeated Samoa with a last-minute try in their 21-19 win to take bronze in the third-place playoff. South Africa, the defending Canada Sevens champions from the two events in 2021, beat the 2020 event winners New Zealand in the fifth-place playoff.

Format
The sixteen teams were drawn into four pools of four. Each team played the three opponents in their pool once. The top two teams from each pool advanced to the Cup bracket, with the losers of the quarter-finals vying for a fifth-place finish. The remaining eight teams that finished third or fourth in their pool played off for 9th place, with the losers of the 9th-place quarter-finals competing for 13th place.

Teams 
The sixteen national teams competing in Canada were:

Pool stage
The pools were announced on 10 April.

 Team advances to the Cup Quarter-finals

Pool A

Pool B

Pool C

Pool D

Knockout stage

13th–16th playoffs

9th–12th playoffs

5th–8th playoffs

Cup playoffs

Placings

See also
 2022 Canada Sevens (for women)

References

External links
 Tournament site

2022
2021–22 World Rugby Sevens Series
2022 rugby sevens competitions
April 2022 sports events in Canada
Sports competitions in Vancouver